This was the first edition of the tournament.

Austin Krajicek and Jackson Withrow won the title after defeating Evan King and Nathan Pasha 6–7(3–7), 6–1, [11–9] in the final.

Seeds

Draw

References
 Main Draw

Oracle Challenger Series - Indian Wells - Men's Doubles